Chronobiology International is a peer-reviewed scientific journal that covers all aspects of biological and medical rhythm research, chronotherapeutics, and chronoprevention of risks. It is the official journal of the International Society for Chronobiology, the American Association for Medical Chronobiology and Chronotherapeutics, and the Society for Light Treatment and Biological Rhythms. According to the Journal Citation Reports, the journal has a current impact factor of 2.562 (2018).

As of 2020, the editor-in-chief is Dr Michael Smolensky. 

Previous Editors-in-Chief of the journal have been: 
 Dr. Francesco Portaluppi, University of Ferrara
 Dr. Alain Reinberg
 Dr. Yvan Touitou

References

External links 
 
  International Society for Chronobiology
  American Association for Medical Chronobiology and Chronotherapeutics
  Society for Light Treatment and Biological Rhythms

Biology journals
Publications established in 1984